Oncidium longicornu is a species of orchid occurring from Brazil to northeastern Argentina, where it is recorded from the provinces of Misiones and Corrientes. It is an epiphytic plant, with yellow flowers appearing between October and November.

References

External links 

longicornu
Orchids of Argentina
Orchids of Brazil